is a 1956 black-and-white Japanese film directed by Senkichi Taniguchi.

Cast
 Ryō Ikebe
 Kaoru Yachigusa

References

Japanese black-and-white films
1956 films
Films directed by Senkichi Taniguchi
1950s Japanese films
Japanese drama films
1956 drama films